Nemophila spatulata, with the common names Sierra baby blue-eyes and Sierra nemophila, is a dicot in the family Boraginaceae.

Distribution
The plant is an annual herb wildflower that grows in California, and adjacent areas of Nevada and Oregon.

It grows in the following plant communities:
Yellow pine forest
Red fir forest
Lodgepole forest

Bioregional Distribution includes:
Southern High Cascade Range
High Sierra Nevada and Southern Sierra Nevada Foothills
Tehachapi Mountains
Transverse Ranges, in the San Bernardino Mountains and Santa Monica Mountains
Peninsular Ranges in the San Jacinto Mountains

Description
The flowers of Nemophila spatulata  are bowl-shaped, white or blue and generally veined and dotted. The lobes are sometimes purple-spotted. The corolla is 2–8 mm long and 2–10 mm wide. The leaves are opposite, 5–30 mm long, and the petiole is winged. The lower blades have 3–5 lobes, are shallow and generally entire. The upper blade lobes have 3–5 triangular teeth.

The seeds are brown and are smooth but shallowly pitted. The fruit produces between 5-7 seeds.

References

External links
Calflora Database — Nemophila spatulata
Jepson Manual Flora Project — Nemophila spatulata
Nemophila spatulata— U.C. Photo gallery

spatulata
Flora of California
Flora of Nevada
Flora of the Sierra Nevada (United States)
Natural history of the California chaparral and woodlands
Natural history of the Peninsular Ranges
Natural history of the Santa Monica Mountains
Natural history of the Transverse Ranges
~
Flora without expected TNC conservation status